Cherepivske is a village (a selo) in the Zaporizhzhia Raion (district) of Zaporizhzhia Oblast in southern Ukraine. Its population was 31 in the 2001 Ukrainian Census. Administratively, it belongs to the Natalivka Rural Council, a local government area.

References

Populated places established in 1878

Zaporizhzhia Raion
Villages in Zaporizhzhia Raion